The Miette River ( or ) is a short river in Jasper National Park, Alberta, Canada. It flows south-southwest through the Rocky Mountains before draining eastward into the Athabasca River at Jasper.

The Miette forms at the base of Mount Moren, with meltwater from Mount Bridgeland, Salient Mountain, Mount McCord, and Mount Beaupre contributing to the initial flow.

The Miette River, as well as various other geological features in Jasper National Park, are named after the Cree language word for bighorn sheep,  .

The Miette River Trail runs along the Miette River. It goes for approximately 43.5 kilometres. The trail follows an abandoned railway for some of its distance. One of the landmarks on the trail is the Rink Cabin.

Tributaries
Rink Brook
Clairvaux Creek
Minaga Creek
Muhigan Creek

See also
List of Alberta rivers

References

Rivers of Alberta
Jasper National Park